Ahmed Abdulrab (born April 27, 1994) is a Yemeni football midfielder who currently plays for That Ras.

International career
Abdulrab made his international debut in 2017, at an AFC Asian Cup qualification match against the Philippines.

References 

Living people
1994 births
Yemeni footballers
Yemen international footballers
Yemeni expatriate footballers
Yemeni expatriate sportspeople in Jordan
Expatriate footballers in Jordan
Al-Tilal SC players
Al-Wehda SC (Aden) players
That Ras Club players
Association football midfielders
Yemeni League players
2019 AFC Asian Cup players